minus20degree (abbreviated to m20d) is a contemporary art and architecture exhibition that takes place every 2 years in Flachau, Austria during winter. The exhibition lasts for 3 days in January. The biennale was founded by Theo Deutinger, Stefanos Filippas, Ana Rita Marques, Eliza Mante, and Heinz Riegler.

The art biennale has consistently invited artists from around the world, and each edition is thematically defined. Artists are invited by the curators of the exhibition, or (since 2016) selected from an open call by a jury. m20d began as an informal presentation of art films projected onto a screen made from snow. Since then it has organically grown into the art biennale that it is today. Artworks are mostly, if not entirely site specific, and are made especially for the art biennale. Artists must confront the challenges and opportunities presented by the winter landscape of Flachau (and its surroundings), making use of the snow and winter environment to inform their artworks. Due to being in public space, the audience includes people who have travelled for the exhibition, as well as locals of the village, and tourists who are on ski vacations.

Earlier editions of the exhibition have presented respected contemporary artists such as Tetsuya Umeda, and Anna Vasof. The most recent edition of minus20degree featured renowned artists such as Roman Signer (who presented in documenta 8, the venice biennale, and the Skulptur Projekte Munster) and Helga Fanderl, who for the first time in m20d projected onto the snow screen of the exhibition with analogue 16mm film.

Etymology of minus20degree 

minus20degree gains its name from the outdoor minimum temperature of its first edition in 2012, -20 degrees Celsius. The intention of the exhibition is to display works of art and architecture in the landscape and public space of Flachau in winter. The snow affords a 'white box' effect similar to that of a standard museum experience. The exhibition has made use of various logos throughout each edition, but is typographically always consistent as lower case letters, written together as one word. Set in Austria, the presentation is bilingual, being in both German and english.

Participating Artists

2012 

The 2012 edition of minus20degree began as a spontaneous idea to create an outdoor snow cinema and invite neighbours and friends to experience projected footage on a wall of snow. This idea quickly turned into an small film festival, screening video works from various artists around the world. Since its inception, the snow screen, or snow cinema has been a fixed feature of every minus20degree biennale.

2014 
The 2014 edition showed a selection of film work from around the world, projected onto an outdoor cinema made from snow.

In addition to the projected works on the snow cinema, a guided walk through the forest landscape of Flachau reenacted the play of Dante's Inferno. By placing actors in the landscape, the natural environment became a series of stages through which the viewers traversed. Instead of placing artworks in a space 'designed' for exhibition, minus20degree appropriates the landscape and public space to serve as a screen, stage, and gallery to the artworks that are displayed and performed.

2016 - Melt 
To date 2016 has presented the largest number of artworks and artists, with 16 artworks on show, 17 nations are represented amongst the 23 artists. The exhibition featured large scale landscape artwork such as that of GEO|METER by Moradavaga, and the performative sound installations of Tetsuya Umeda. The central hub of the exhibition was staged in an excavated snow room; this also served as the projection screen of the edition, for artworks of Christine Maigne and Denis Beaubois. 2016 introduced a performance of Thomas Bernhard's novel, Frost, in which the audience was guided through the dark and snowed over forest of Flachau, while listening to excerpts of the novel's text. The pacing of the walk, and the scenery were curated and timed to synch with the books reading, and emotive qualities, overlaying literature with landscape. In this edition 198 projects were submitted in the open call. One artist, Paul Wiersbinski attempted to break the guinness world record for the largest snowball with the help of passers-by and tourists.

2018 - World of Wellness 
Alongside the contributing artists of the 2018 edition of minus20degree, the exhibition collaborated with the Munster University of Applied Sciences, allowing students to present their site-related architectural work. In addition to this, m20d18 hosted a symposium, in which the future of the exhibition was discussed. External stake holders of the village and contributing artists were welcome to attend and help shape the festival.

2020 - Global Village 
The thematic description of minus20degree 2020 gains inspiration from the theoretical work of Marshall McLuhan. m20d20 collaborated once again with the institution of FH Munster, inviting 17 architecture students to erect a temporary wooden village within Flachau to serve as an epicenter for the exhibition.

2022 - Remote 

The 2022 edition of the biennale and 10th anniversary since it began featured artists that were invited by a jury consisting of Anna Vasof, Karolina Radenkovic, and Marek Adomov and Barbora Jombikova of Stanica nd the New Synagogue (Žilina), two cultural centres in Zilina. Kasper König joined as co-curator which allowed the invitation of a number of renowned artists. Laura Horelli was invited as a visiting artist to observe the exhibition and the village in preparation for her contribution in the 2024 edition of m20d.

As a part of the exhibition, minus20degree collaborated with the Social Design course of the University of Applied Arts Vienna (Universität für angewandte Kunst Wien) allowing students the opportunity to contribute artworks to the space of the village either as individual artists or small collectives. One such artwork depicting a false advert for McDonald's sparked controvosy amongst the village. Collectief Walden from the Netherlands installed a heated altar and seating, from which an operetta was performed; the lyrics of this performance were lifted from interviews with the local residents of the village. This performance was staged in front of the old saw mill of Flachau, the Kirchner Sägewerk.

References

External links 
 https://www.m20d.eu/
 https://www.sn.at/wiki/Minus20degree

Art exhibitions in Austria
Exhibition Place